The Christian Association for Psychological Studies (CAPS), founded in 1956, is an association of American Christians in the counseling and behavioral sciences. It holds a yearly conference and publishes the Journal of Psychology and Christianity, which is indexed in psychological and other scholarly databases.

History
The founding of CAPS has been described as part of a recovery of interest in religion among psychologists. Ian Jones stated that CAPS provides alternatives to secular organizations such as the American Psychological Association.

Development
CAPS has several chapters across the United States. Its publishing arm publishes books. Extensive information about the history of CAPS is available in a book published for CAPS' 50th anniversary, edited by Stevenson, Eck and Hill.

References

External links
 

Professional associations based in the United States
Organizations based in Illinois